Casiornis is a genus of South American birds in the tyrant flycatcher family Tyrannidae.

The genus  contains the following two species:

References

 
Bird genera
Taxonomy articles created by Polbot